The Consortium for School Networking (CoSN) is a member-based association and advocacy group based in Washington, DC, United States, that promotes partnerships and awareness of emerging technologies amongst technology decision-makers in K-12 education.

History
CoSN was formed in 1992. CoSN was part of a coalition which advocated for the 1997 enactment of E-Rate, a component of the Universal Service Fund, which provides discounts to assist most schools and libraries in the United States (and U.S. territories) to obtain affordable telecommunications and Internet access, and CoSN has since continued its advocacy for the program. CoSN also played a leading role in advocating for sound technology policies within the 2001 reauthorization of the Elementary and Secondary Education Act (ESEA).

References

External links
 CoSN website
 Universal Service Administrative Company

Educational organizations based in the United States
Organizations established in 1992
United States schools associations
Non-profit organizations based in Washington, D.C.